Maël was a fifth-century Breton saint who lived as a hermit in Wales. He was a follower of Cadfan from Brittany to Wales, ultimately to the Isle of Bardsey. His feast day is 13 May.

He is co-patron (with St Sulien) of Corwen in Wales, and of its parish church, part of the Anglican Communion Church in Wales.

Notes

Companions of Cadfan
6th-century Christian saints